Shoreliners are a class of locomotive-hauled rail car used by the Metro-North Railroad for service on non-electrified portions of their system. They are similar to the Comet coaches used by New Jersey Transit, however there are several differences between the two. Ownership of the fleet is split between the Metropolitan Transportation Authority and the Connecticut Department of Transportation, as part of the latter's operating agreement with the MTA. MTA coaches have blue window bands, while CDOT coaches have red ones.

Usage patterns
The Shoreliners are primarily used on non-electric territory such as the upper Hudson Line north of Croton-Harmon, on the upper Harlem Line north of Southeast station, and the New Haven Line's Danbury and Waterbury branches. They are typically operated in a push-pull configuration.

Hudson Line
Shoreliners are used in the non-electrified territory north of Croton-Harmon. Trains often operate to and from Grand Central Terminal and  Poughkeepsie and running express south of Croton-Harmon, along with two daily late night shuttle trains running in the non-electrified territory, one in each direction.

Harlem Line
Shoreliners are used in the non-electrified territory north of Southeast. Service between Southeast and Wassaic is mostly operated using three car shuttle trains. During rush hour, a few trains run direct to Grand Central Terminal.

New Haven Line branches
Shoreliners operate on the Danbury and Waterbury branches, as well as to provide extra service on the main line during the day. Danbury service includes limited through-service to Grand Central during peak periods, while off-peak Danbury and all Waterbury service operates as shuttles from South Norwalk and Bridgeport, respectively.

Former Shore Line East Service
Before the state of Connecticut acquired used equipment for Shore Line East, several Shoreliner sets would run on SLE service. These have since been transferred to the Metro-North pool.

Models

Shoreliners I and II

The Shoreliners I and II were built in 1983 and 1987, respectively. Based on the New Jersey Transit Comet II, their only difference is the type of lighting used for indicator lights. These cars have doors at each end vestibule, and no center door. 

The Shoreliner I order includes 39 cars, while the Shoreliner II order includes 36 cars. Cars numbered in the 6200s are owned by Connecticut DOT, which include 14 cab cars and 26 coaches, while all other cars are owned by the MTA.

Four of the Shoreliner I cars were originally equipped with an underfloor head-end power generator, for use behind CTDOT's five rebuilt freight locomotives, which lacked HEP generators. The generators were removed when the freight locomotives were replaced by CTDOT's rebuilt GP40-2H units. These cars are identified externally by twin square windows at the center of the cars, where the air intake ductwork (to the rooftop) for the generator was located.

Shoreliner III

Shoreliner IIIs date from 1991; 49 cars were built. This series is based on New Jersey Transit's Comet III. The main differences between this series and previous ones are an added center door and the restroom is located at the center of the cars that are so equipped instead of the end.

Shoreliner IV

The Shoreliner IV is much like the Shoreliner III but the engineers side door has been removed as a safety measure. Based on the NJ Transit Comet IV, they were built in two distinct groups between 1996 and 1998. The first order, from 1996–97, consisted of 50 cars. The second set, built for Connecticut DOT in 1998, consisted of 10 cars. One Connecticut DOT-owned coach and one cab car were wrecked in 2013. This gives a total count for the order of 60 cars.

Car names 
Many of Shoreliner cars are named in honor of people and places significant to their service area, such as The Connecticut Yankee and Washington Irving.

See also 
Horizon (railcar) – railcars operated by Amtrak similar in design to that of the Comets and Shoreliners.

References

Rail passenger cars of the United States
Metro-North Railroad